Old Gods of Appalachia is a horror podcast written by Cam Collins and Steve Shell that debuted on October 31, 2019. The show is produced by DeepNerd Media, is distributed by Rusty Quill, and was adapted into a role-playing game by Monte Cook Games. Each episode uses a combination of narration and audio drama to tell historical fiction stories based on Appalachian folklore.

Background 
The show is written by Steve Shell and Cam Collins. The stories are original fiction that draws on a mix of history and folk tales for inspiration and address strange things from witchcraft to the paranormal. The cast for the show either currently live or grew up in Appalachia.

Reception 
Toni Oisin of Collider praised the show saying that "The style the script is written in is gripping, making it hard to switch off after the first episode." Aysel Atamdede of 60 Seconds Magazine praised the show saying that the podcast contains "immersive, wonderfully written, lovingly narrated stories." A reader's pick on Vulture written by Eli L. praised the show saying that "it captures the spirit of Appalachia in a way that makes me nostalgic … in addition to keeping me jumping at shadows!"

Awards

Adaption 
The creation of the roleplaying game based on the Old Gods of Appalachia was formally announced on November 12, 2021. The show was adapted by Monte Cook Games.

References

External links

 

2019 podcast debuts
Horror podcasts
Audio podcasts
American podcasts
Scripted podcasts
Horror role-playing games
Appalachia in fiction
Podcasts adapted for other media